Pedro María Azpiazu Uriarte (Bilbao, 28 April 1957) is a Basque Nationalist Party (PNV) politician who represents Biscay Province in the Spanish Congress of Deputies, where he serves as a PNV spokesman. Azpiazu was first elected at the 2000 general election.

References

1957 births
Basque Nationalist Party politicians
Economy ministers of the Basque Country (autonomous community)
Finance ministers of the Basque Country (autonomous community)
Living people
Members of the 7th Congress of Deputies (Spain)
Members of the 8th Congress of Deputies (Spain)
Members of the 9th Congress of Deputies (Spain)
Members of the 10th Congress of Deputies (Spain)
Members of the 11th Congress of Deputies (Spain)
Members of the 12th Congress of Deputies (Spain)
Politicians from Bilbao